The Belgium men's national under-20 basketball team is a national basketball team of Belgium, administered by the Basketball Belgium. It represents the country in international men's under-20 basketball competitions.

FIBA U20 European Championship participations

See also
Belgium men's national basketball team
Belgium men's national under-19 basketball team
Belgium women's national under-20 basketball team

References

External links
Archived records of Belgium team participations

Basketball in Belgium
National youth sports teams of Belgium
Men's national under-20 basketball teams